Gustaf Lindblom (19 August 1883 – 16 March 1976) was a Swedish épée and foil fencer. He competed at four Olympic Games.

References

External links
 

1883 births
1976 deaths
Swedish male foil fencers
Swedish male épée fencers
Olympic fencers of Sweden
Fencers at the 1908 Summer Olympics
Fencers at the 1912 Summer Olympics
Fencers at the 1920 Summer Olympics
Fencers at the 1924 Summer Olympics
Sportspeople from Stockholm
20th-century Swedish people